Baikiaea is a genus of flowering plants in the legume family, Fabaceae.

Species include:
Baikiaea fragrantissima
Baikiaea ghesquiereana
Baikiaea insignis
Baikiaea plurijuga – Rhodesian-teak
Baikiaea robynsii Ghesq. ex Laing
Baikiaea suzannae Ghesq.
Baikiaea zenkeri

Baikiaea is the characteristic tree of two dry woodland ecoregions of southern Africa, the Kalahari Acacia-Baikiaea woodlands and Zambezian Baikiaea woodlands.

The genus is named after William Balfour Baikie (1824-1864), Scottish explorer of the Niger River.

References

Detarioideae
Fabaceae genera
Taxonomy articles created by Polbot